Allardice is a surname of Scottish origin deriving from the name of a town in Kincardineshire (Alrethes) where the family was located. Notable people with the surname include:

Geoff Allardice (born 1967), Australian cricketer
James B. Allardice (1919—1966), American television comedy writer
Lesley Allardice (born 1957), British swimmer
Michael Allardice (born 1991), New Zealand rugby union player
Robert Barclay Allardice (1779—1854), a.k.a. Captain Barclay, Scottish Laird and noted sport walker
Robert Edgar Allardice (1862-1928), Scottish mathematician
Robert R. Allardice (born c. 1958), United States Air Force general
Scott Allardice, Scottish footballer

See also
Allardice Castle, a sixteenth-century manor house in Kincardineshire, Scotland
Allardyce

References

Surnames of Scottish origin